Henry Corby (1806 – 25 October 1881) was an Ontario baker, businessman, and politician. Born and raised in England, Corby immigrated to Upper Canada in 1832. After building businesses in Belleville, Ontario, he served as the 9th mayor of Belleville from 1867 to 1868 and represented Hastings East in the Legislative Assembly of Ontario as a Conservative from 1867 to 1874.

Life and career
Corby was born in Hanwell, England, in 1806. He was apprenticed to a baker in London.

In 1832, Corby married Alma Williams and moved to Belleville, then in Upper Canada, where he opened a general store and bakery, and secured a contract to supply the local militia.

On 24 December 1835, Alma and their three children drowned in the Bay of Quinte after the ice broke while the family were riding a sleigh.

In 1838, Corby became involved in shipping goods between Belleville and Kingston, and selling grain.

Corby served for a number of years on the Belleville village council and continued to be politically active as a Conservative. In 1855, he purchased a gristmill and foundeded his distillery in 1859.

In 1867, Corby was elected as the mayor of Belleville and an Ontario MPP representing Hastings East. He helped promote the development of railways in the area, which were a catalyst to increasing trade and residents. He left the office of mayor in 1868.

Corby retired from politics in 1875 due to declining health. He died on 25 October 1881. He was survived by his son, Henry Jr. (1851–1917).

Legacy
The town where Corby's distillery was located was renamed as Corbyville in 1882, in his honour.

References

External links 
Biography at the Dictionary of Canadian Biography Online

Legislative Assembly of Ontario

1806 births
1881 deaths
19th-century Canadian businesspeople
19th-century Canadian merchants
19th-century Canadian politicians
Businesspeople from Belleville, Ontario
Businesspeople from London
Canadian bakers
Canadian drink distillers
English emigrants to pre-Confederation Ontario
Immigrants to Upper Canada
Mayors of Belleville, Ontario
People from Hanwell
Politicians from Belleville, Ontario
Politicians from London
Progressive Conservative Party of Ontario MPPs